St. Thomas Aquinas College (STAC) is a private college in Sparkill, New York. The college is named after the medieval philosopher and theologian Thomas Aquinas. It was founded by the Dominican Sisters of Sparkill, whose headquarters are in the town. The college offers 35 majors across three schools: Arts and Sciences, Business, and Education.

Facilities
 Romano Center
 Also known as the Romano Student-Alumni Center, or RSAC for short. This building houses the Spartan Grille, a fast food counter restaurant along with dining seating areas located throughout the hall. Romano Center also houses the campus' bookstore, a small stage, a small video game area, a pool table area, and other campus service offices.

 Maguire Hall
 Primarily consists of offices and classrooms. This section of the campus also houses Sullivan Theater, a small performing arts theater. It also features some art studios and a seminar room, known as the Smith Seminar room.

 Naughton Hall / Marian Gardens
 Naugton Hall consists of professors offices. Marian Gardens consists of a walking path and a small rest area.

 Aquinas Hall
 This hall is located at the center of the campus. It consists of Campus Safety & Security, the Mail Room, the Aquinas Hall Gymnasium, The Kraus Fitness Center, and Athletics Offices.

 Costello Hall
 Consists of offices and classrooms related to the division of science education. It has science labs and lecture-like classrooms. The hall also houses the Azarian-McCullough Art Gallery and the Poggi Family Terrace.

 Spellman Hall
 Consists of classrooms, computer labs, and many academic and administrative offices. This hall also consists of the Lougheed Library and the Center for Academic Excellence, a tutoring center for all STAC students. There is also a television/media studio.

 Borelli Hall
 Consists of offices and classrooms related to the majors of business and education. It is also the hall where the Office of the President is housed.

 Aquinas Village 
 Consists of residence dorms for upperclassmen and tennis courts where the men's and women's tennis teams play.

 McNelis Commons 
 Consists of residence dorms for lowerclassmen and a buffet-styled cafeteria.

Athletics
St. Thomas Aquinas athletic teams are the Spartans. The college is a member of the Division II level of the National Collegiate Athletic Association (NCAA), primarily competing in the East Coast Conference (ECC) for most of its sports since the 2000–01 academic year; while its spring football team competes in the Collegiate Sprint Football League (CSFL). The Spartans previously competed in the Central Atlantic Collegiate Conference (CACC) from 1965–66 to 1998–99.

St. Thomas Aquinas competes in 20 intercollegiate varsity sports: Men's sports include baseball, basketball, cross country, golf, ice hockey, lacrosse, soccer, sprint football, tennis and track & field; while women's sports include basketball, bowling, cross country, field hockey, lacrosse, soccer, softball, tennis, track & field and triathlon.

Club sports are also available at the college, including cheer and dance team and volleyball.  The Spartans have a cross-campus rivalry with the Dominican College Chargers since they are geographically a mile away from each other. Their mascot is The Spartan.

Notable alumni

Barbara Corcoran, self-made real estate millionaire who sold her company The Corcoran Group for $70 million in 2001.
Gordon M. Johnson, Representative of the 37th legislative district in the New Jersey General Assembly.
Frank Messina, poet and author.
Gordon Chiesa, assistant coach for the Memphis Grizzlies of the NBA.
Craig Zucker, Maryland State Senator for the 14th Legislative District,  Montgomery County 
Steve Maney, morning radio host WNKS Charlotte. Cast of TLC “My Big Fat Fabulous Life” 
Jeremy Brown, former Deputy Editor of WWE Magazine, former Creative Writer for WWE TV, Novelist
John Jurasek, aka TheReportOfTheWeek and Reviewbrah, YouTube fast-food reviewer
Joseph Winter, Commander, 175th Force Support Squadron,  Maryland Air National Guard and Chief of Education and Training - Civil Air Patrol, Maxwell AFB, AL.

References

External links
 
 Official athletics website

 
Dominican universities and colleges in the United States
Educational institutions established in 1952
Universities and colleges in Rockland County, New York
Catholic universities and colleges in New York (state)
1952 establishments in New York (state)